Clarence Howard Johnston Sr. (August 26, 1859 – December 29, 1936) was an American architect who practiced in the US state of Minnesota during the late 1800s and early 1900s. Specializing in domestic, religious, and public architecture, he served as Minnesota State Architect from 1901 to 1931. He is considered one of the most prolific architects in the state's history.

Early life
Johnston's parents, Alexander Johnston and Louise Johnston (née Buckhout), moved to Waseca County, Minnesota, in 1856, along with a few other families. They established a settlement named Okaman on the shores of Lake Elysian. Their first son, John Buckhout Johnston, was born in 1858, and became a prominent manufacturer and businessman. Clarence Johnston was born August 26, 1859. The family then moved to Wilton, which was then the county seat of Waseca County, and Alexander Johnston took over the publication of a local newspaper. In 1861 the family moved to Faribault. Their third child, Grace, was born March 2, 1862. They moved again, to Saint Paul, where their fourth child, Charles Albert, was born in 1864. After moving briefly to Hastings, the family returned to Saint Paul permanently in 1868. Alexander Johnston was then a reporter for the Daily Pioneer newspaper.

Education and apprenticeship

Johnston started attending Saint Paul High School in 1872 and took on a job as a clerk at the law firm of Rogers and Rogers.  His mother died May 8, 1874, at the age of 42. That same year, Johnston quit his clerical job and began work at the firm of Abraham M. Radcliffe as a draughtsman. Radcliffe's firm was a local training ground for aspiring architects at the time.  In September 1876, Cass Gilbert joined Radcliffe's firm as an apprentice, and Gilbert and Johnston soon became close friends.

In the fall of 1878, Gilbert and Johnston enrolled at the Massachusetts Institute of Technology (MIT). There they met James Knox Taylor, who had also grown up in Saint Paul and joined MIT as an architectural student a year earlier. Gilbert and Johnston, along with Taylor, had opted to take the special two-year course in architecture, rather than the full four-year degree-granting program. However, Johnston was forced to drop out after one term due to financial reasons. He moved back to Saint Paul and worked briefly at the firm of Edward Bassford, where the firm was more conscious of costs to the client in the design and construction process. This influenced Johnston to view economic constraints as a challenge to be solved by inventiveness, instead of being a restriction on his artistry. During these years, Gilbert and Johnston kept in touch through a large number of letters.

In January 1880, Cass Gilbert departed to Europe for an architectural tour. Gilbert wrote back to Johnston urging him to make a similar trip, but Johnston was preoccupied with a job offer from Herter Brothers in New York. One of the projects on which he worked during his tenure at Herter Brothers was J.P. Morgan's brownstone house on Madison Avenue at 36th Street. In the summer of 1880, Cass Gilbert returned from Europe and settled in New York, working for the firm of McKim, Mead & White. Gilbert and Johnston, along with their MIT classmate Francis Bacon, shared rooms at 40 Irving Place. That same year Johnston, Gilbert, Bacon, Taylor, and William A. Bates founded the Sketch Club, which later became the Architectural League of New York. Accounts vary on which members were actually the founders of the club.

Career

After finally traveling to Europe and the Asia Minor in February 1883, Johnston returned to the United States and established his own practice in Minnesota in 1886. He quickly gained a reputation as a respected domestic architect, designing countless homes and churches in Saint Paul, especially in the vicinity of Summit Avenue and Saint Paul's Hill District. In 1886 Johnston formed a partnership with William H. Willcox which lasted through 1890. In 1895 Johnston entered the competition to design the new Minnesota State Capitol, but lost to Cass Gilbert.

On May 22, 1901, the Minnesota State Board of Control, a body responsible for the construction and operation of all state-funded institutions, appointed Johnston as State Architect. As State Architect, Johnston prepared plans for the Minnesota State Prison, buildings at various state college campuses, hospitals, sanitoriums, and other public structures. Since state business was at the whims of the Minnesota Legislature and was not always consistent, he continued his private practice during this time. Retaining private commissions allowed him to operate his office continuously and receive a higher rate of return. Johnston continued as State Architect until 1931, when the State Division of Construction was dissolved.

Johnston was also architect for the Board of Regents of the University of Minnesota and drew plans for all the new buildings constructed on campus during his tenure.

Johnston never officially retired, but backed off on his practice after the State Architect position dissolved in 1931. He died December 29, 1936.

Family and personal life

Johnston married Mary "May" Thurston October 1, 1885. The couple had a total of five children.

Johnston's son, Clarence H. Johnston Jr, was also an architect. Taking charge of the Johnston firm upon his father's death, he went on to design Coffman Memorial Union and the old Bell Museum building at the University of Minnesota, among other projects.

Johnston was also the father of Jimmy Johnston, a noted amateur golfer.

State Architect projects

The Minnesota State Board of Control was initially in charge of nine institutions. Johnston designed buildings at these following institutions:

While Johnston was State Architect, the Minnesota State Board of Control added the following institutions to its governance:

For all the institutions above, Clarence H. Johnston Sr. either designed new buildings, designed improvements to existing buildings, or both.

Notable works

University of Minnesota, Minneapolis Campus
 Child Development and Folwell Hall, part of the University of Minnesota Old Campus Historic District
 Collaborator with Cass Gilbert on the Northrop Mall
 Northrop Auditorium
 Walter Library
 Williams Arena

University of Minnesota, Saint Paul Campus
 Haecker Hall (Dairy Husbandry)
 Biosystems and Agricultural Engineering Building
 Coffey Hall
 McNeal Hall
 Eastcliff, the residence of the President of the University of Minnesota

Other buildings

 Minnesota State Fair Grandstand
 Burbank–Livingston–Griggs House, 432 Summit Avenue, Saint Paul
 976 Summit Ave., Saint Paul
 Pierce and Walter Butler House, 1345-1347 Summit Avenue, Saint Paul
 Henry Byllesby Row House, Saint Paul
 Saint Paul Academy, lower school building, formerly the Summit School for Girls
 Minnesota State Academy for the Deaf Administration Building, Faribault, Minnesota
 Glensheen Historic Estate, Duluth, Minnesota
 Duluth State Normal School buildings, now the University of Minnesota Duluth lower campus
 Several buildings of the University of Minnesota Morris, dating back to its foundation as West Central School of Agriculture and Experiment Station Historic District
 Saint Paul Central High School, 1912 building at Marshall Avenue and Lexington Parkway.
 Minnesota Humanities Center (Formerly Dowling Memorial Hall on the Gillette Children's Hospital Campus at Phalen Lake), 1924. Building at 987 Ivy Avenue East in Saint Paul, Minnesota
 Several buildings on the Saint Paul campus of Hamline University.
 City Hall Annex (Lowry Medical Arts Building).
 Trade and Commerce Building, 916 Hammond Avenue, Superior, Wisconsin.
 Farrar-Howes Houses, 596-604 Summit Avenue, Saint Paul, Minnesota
Holy Trinity Church, Veseli, Minnesota

References

External links

 Clarence H. Johnston in MNopedia, the Minnesota Encyclopedia 
 Gracious Spaces: Clarence H. Johnston, Minnesota Architect Documentary produced by Twin Cities Public Television

1859 births
1936 deaths
Architects from Saint Paul, Minnesota
MIT School of Architecture and Planning alumni
University of Minnesota people
People from Waseca County, Minnesota